Zhang Huoding (born 24 January 1971) is a Peking opera singer. She is a singer in the "Cheng-pai" tradition, or school of Cheng Yanqiu (程砚秋, 1904–1958). Zhang is best known in the West for the title role in the 2003 video of the revolutionary opera Sister Jiang directed by Zhang Yuan. She was seen in a Chinese opera version of the Legend of the White Snake at the David H. Koch Theater at Lincoln Center, New York City, in her US debut in 2015.

References

Chinese Peking opera actresses
1971 births
Living people
National Academy of Chinese Theatre Arts alumni
People from Baicheng
21st-century Chinese women singers
20th-century Chinese women singers
20th-century Chinese actresses
21st-century Chinese actresses
Actresses from Jilin
Singers from Jilin